Café Boulud is a French restaurant located at 20 East 76th Street (between Fifth Avenue and Madison Avenue), inside the Surrey Hotel, on the Upper East Side in Manhattan, in New York City.  It is owned by French celebrity chef and restaurateur Daniel Boulud.  Boulud is New York City's longest-tenured four-star chef.

The restaurant opened in 1998. It is named for a restaurant just outside Lyon, France, that was once owned by Boulud's family. In the summer, it has terrace tables.

Reviews
A review in 2000 in which The New York Times gave it three stars said: "Cafe Boulud is sleek and easy, and the entire staff has been given permission to have fun. You never quite know what the menu will offer. Most days there are 30 or more dishes, and none are ordinary."

In 2013, Zagat's gave it a food rating of 27, the third-highest rating in the East 70s.  One Zagat's reviewer called it: "A neighborhood bistro for billionaires."

References

External links
Café Boulud website

Restaurants in Manhattan
Restaurants established in 1998
Upper East Side
French-American culture in New York City
1998 establishments in New York City
Michelin Guide starred restaurants in New York (state)
French restaurants in New York City